Cristina Isabel Sánchez Auñón (born 23 March 1989), often known as Sole, is a Spanish footballer who plays as a defender for Alavés.

Club career
Auñón started her career at Rayo Vallecano B at the age of 18 and stayed there for three years. In her ninth season at Rayo Vallecano, Auñón was made captain. On 17 March 2021, she was handed a five match suspension for aggressive behaviour towards a referee, a charge which she denied. After spending a total of 11 seasons at Rayo Vallecano, Auñón departed for Alavés in August 2021, signing a one year contract at her new club.

Personal life
Auñón earned the nickname 'Sole' after a coach remarked that she resembled Soledad Giménez from the Spanish band Presuntos Implicados.

References

External links
Profile at La Liga

1989 births
Living people
Women's association football defenders
Spanish women's footballers
Footballers from Madrid
Rayo Vallecano Femenino players
Deportivo Alavés Gloriosas players
Primera División (women) players
AD Torrejón CF Femenino players